Wesley Duaine Sweetser (1919–2006) was an English critic.

Born in National City, California, United States, he attended the University of Colorado, where he gained a Ph.D. in 1958 for a thesis on Welsh writer Arthur Machen. He served for a long period in the United States Air Force, reaching the rank of captain.

This enthusiasm led him to publish a valuable Machen biography and bibliography with Adrian Goldstone based on his earlier thesis. He played an important part in supporting the 1960s revival in Machen's works.

Works 
 Arthur Machen: Essays by Adrian Goldstone, C. A. and Anthony Lejeune, Father Brocard Sewell (editor), Maurice Spurway, Wesley D. Sweetser, Henry Williamson. Llandeilo: St. Albert's Press, 1960.
 Sweetser, Wesley D. Arthur Machen. Twayne Publishers, 1964.
 A Bibliography of Arthur Machen by Goldstone, Adrian H.; Sweetser, Wesley D. University of Texas, Austin, Texas, 1973.
 Ralph Hodgson — a Bibliography by Wesley D. Sweetser. Garland, New York, 1980.

1919 births
2006 deaths
People from National City, California
University of Colorado alumni
American literary critics
United States Air Force officers
Journalists from California
20th-century American journalists
American male journalists
Military personnel from California